The Spanish Armadas is a 1972 non-fiction history book by the British author Winston Graham. It concerns the Anglo-Spanish War of the late Elizabethan era. The period held a fascination for Graham, who had previously written a novel The Grove of Eagles about it nine years earlier.

References

1972 non-fiction books
Works by Winston Graham
Anglo-Spanish War (1585–1604)